Michael Meeropol (born Michael Rosenberg on March 10, 1943) is an American retired professor of economics. He is the older son of Julius and Ethel Rosenberg, convicted communist spies. Born in New York City, as Michael Rosenberg, Meeropol spent his early childhood living in New York and attending local school there.

His father Julius, an electrical engineer, and his mother Ethel (née Greenglass), a union organizer, were members of the Communist Party. When Michael was seven years old, his parents were apprehended. In 1951, they were convicted and sentenced to death for conspiracy to commit espionage related to the passing of atomic secrets to the Soviet Union. After two years, during which they both maintained their innocence, and a worldwide campaign for executive clemency raged, they were executed in June 1953.

Early years
During the trial, Michael and his younger brother Robert lived first with their maternal grandmother, Tessie Greenglass, until November 1950, when she placed them in the Hebrew Children's Home in the Bronx. In June 1951, they moved in with their paternal grandmother, Sophie Rosenberg, in upper Manhattan until June 1952, at which time they were taken in by family friends, Ben and Sonia Bach, in Toms River, New Jersey, from June 1952 until the December after their parents' executions on June 19, 1953. The Toms River school superintendent "turned the boys away as non-residents".<ref>{{cite magazine |url=http://www.time.com/time/magazine/article/0,9171,913052-1,00.html |archive-url=https://web.archive.org/web/20121022175508/http://www.time.com/time/magazine/article/0,9171,913052-1,00.html |url-status=dead |archive-date=October 22, 2012 |first=R.Z. |last=Sheppard |series=Books |title=Generation on trial? review of We Are Your Sons' |magazine=Time Magazine |date=May 5, 1975}}</ref>

Later family life and education
The brothers were eventually adopted by the lyricist, librettist, and musician Abel Meeropol and his wife Anne, whose first children had been stillborn. Taking their last name, Michael and Robert grew up first in Manhattan and then (after 1961) in Hastings-on-Hudson, New York.

Michael graduated from Swarthmore College, before going on to graduate work at King's College, Cambridge. In 1973, he received his Ph.D. in economics from the University of Wisconsin–Madison.

Career
Meeropol eventually became an economist, teaching at Western New England College (now Western New England University), a small private college in Springfield, Massachusetts. In 1998 he authored Surrender: How the Clinton Administration Completed the Reagan Revolution. Many of his articles have advocated liberal to left-wing economic policies, including, in 2005, his opposition to the Bush administration's efforts to partially privatize Social Security. Since September 2006 he has been a monthly commentator on the Albany NPR-affiliate WAMC radio.

He and his brother Robert have written about their parents as well as participated in documentaries about them. Together they wrote We Are Your Sons (1975). A second edition was published in 1986 (University of Illinois Press) with three new chapters, including a rebuttal to the book, The Rosenberg File. Meeropol said that even though the authors got it "right" about the (partial) guilt of Julius Rosenberg, Michael Meeropol said they were "right" like a stopped clock is right twice a day.

Meeropol separately edited a complete edition of his parents' prison correspondence, The Rosenberg Letters (1994). Though currently not speaking in public about his parents' case as much as his brother, he remains a strong advocate for his parents. His daughter Ivy Meeropol  interviewed both brothers about the Rosenberg trial and his childhood for her 2004 film Heir to an Execution, and included new comments from Michael in her 2019 documentary on Roy Cohn. In the latter, we see the younger Michael Meeropol debating Roy Cohn in 1981, as well as re-visiting Sing Sing in September 2018.

Meeropol retired as professor of economics and chair of the department at Western New England University in December 2008. He worked for four years at John Jay College of Criminal Justice of the City University of New York teaching economics and interdisciplinary studies. He taught his last class at John Jay in May 2014.

In 2013, he co-authored a textbook, Principles Of Macroeconomics:  Activist vs. austerity policies.In June of 2022 he openly called for non-violent nuisance protest at the homes of NRA board members because they enable mass murderers.  The exact quote as reported by FOX is: 

He also floated the idea of throwing red paint on the front stoop, driveway and lawn of their homes in order to make them "uncomfortable."

Marriage and family
In December 1965, Meeropol married Ann Karusaitis. They have two children, Ivy and Greg, and two grandchildren.  His wife died in May 2019.

Current position on parents' executions
In 2008, after the Rosenberg co-defendant Morton Sobell admitted that he and Julius Rosenberg had engaged in espionage on behalf of the Soviet Union during World War II, Michael and Robert Meeropol agreed that their father was a Soviet spy. But they reiterated what they perceived to be the failures of the government prosecution:"[W]hatever atomic bomb information their father passed to the Russians was, at best, superfluous; the case was riddled with prosecutorial and judicial misconduct; their mother was convicted on flimsy evidence to place leverage on her husband, and neither deserved the death penalty." A month later, the brothers published an op-ed in the Los Angeles Times stating that Sobell's confession revealed no detail about the theft of the atom bomb design. They noted that the witness Ruth Greenglass' recently released grand jury testimony said nothing about Ethel Rosenberg's alleged spying activities, for which the government convicted her.

The Meeropol brothers have endorsed the conclusions of Walter Schneir, in his posthumously published book Final Verdict, that Greenglass's version of events was concocted – that Julius Rosenberg had been given notice of termination by the KGB in early 1945, and thus was out of the espionage loop when a cross-section drawing of an implosion-type atomic bomb (exhibit 8 at the Rosenberg Trial) was passed to the Soviets. Schneir said that David and / or Ruth Greenglass turned that drawing and descriptive material over to a KGB agent in December 1945 – not, as testified at the trial, to Julius Rosenberg in September 1945.

In 2015 after the death of David Greenglass, his secret grand jury testimony was released. Claiming that that testimony supported their view that their mother was not an espionage agent (twice Greenglass under oath before the Grand Jury asserted he had never spoken with his sister about any of his espionage activities with Julius Rosenberg or Ruth Greenglass) the brothers Meeropol wrote an op-ed in The New York Times'' demanding that the US government exonerate their mother. On September 28, 2015, the date that would have been Ethel Rosenberg's 100th birthday, the brothers and eight members of their extended families (including one great-grandchild of the Rosenbergs) gathered on the steps of New York's City Hall to receive two proclamations – one by 13 City Council members and one by the Borough President of Manhattan honoring Ethel Rosenberg and decrying her reputedly false conviction and execution.

Meeropol and his brother Robert appeared on the CBS news magazine show 60 Minutes in the fall of 2016 arguing that their mother deserved exoneration because of the recent release of grand jury testimony by her chief accuser, David Greenglass, which directly contradicted his trial testimony against her. They submitted requests to President Obama for a proclamation to in effect nullify the original jury verdict because of the perjuries involved in the government's case against her. This request was accompanied by the documents including grand jury minutes supporting their arguments. On December 1, 2016 Meeropol and his brother Robert stood outside the White House gate to symbolically re-create the effort they engaged in back in 1953 when Michael delivered a handwritten letter to President Eisenhower asking for clemency for his parents to a White House guard.  They turned in petitions containing more than 60,000 signatures in support of their request. The request received no response, and it is unclear if President Obama was ever aware of the request.

Meeropol published a 2018 article revisiting his uncle David Greenglass' testimony and role in the Rosenberg case.

References

External links
 
 
 
 
 
 

1943 births
Living people
American adoptees
Economists from New York (state)
20th-century American Jews
Julius and Ethel Rosenberg
Scientists from New York City
People from Toms River, New Jersey
Swarthmore College alumni
University of Wisconsin–Madison College of Letters and Science alumni
Western New England University faculty
Educators from New York City
Economists from New Jersey
21st-century American economists
21st-century American Jews